Joes Mountain is a mountain in York County in the state of South Carolina. The mountain is one of the three main mountain summits of Kings Mountain National Military Park. The other mountain summits are Brown's Mountain and Kings Mountain.

External links 
Joe's Mountain Summit - South Carolina Mountain Peak Information

Mountains of South Carolina
Landforms of York County, South Carolina
Inselbergs of Piedmont (United States)